The Zalud House is a historic house located at 393 N. Hockett St. in Porterville, California.

History
The house was built by John Zalud, a Porterville businessman, in 1891. Architects Hugh and John Templeton designed the building in the Second Empire style; the house is the only Second Empire home in Porterville. The design includes a mansard roof with decorated dormer windows, a front porch with wooden ornamentation, and tall double-hung sash windows on the front and sides. While the house was built in brick, a departure from the standard wood construction of Second Empire buildings, it uses wood extensively in its detailing. 
In 1977, the city of Porterville converted the house to a museum. The Zalud House was listed on the National Register of Historic Places on March 31, 1987.

On television
On December 10, 2016, the Zalud House was the featured as a lockdown location on a season 13 episode of Ghost Adventures, where a 'cursed chair' in an upstairs bedroom caused visitors to have chest pains. In 1917, orange grower William Brookes (John Zalud's son-in-law) was murdered in this chair while sitting in the lobby of the former Pioneer Hotel. He was shot four times and killed by a married woman named Julia Howe, who objected to what he was saying about her after bragging he had an affair with her.

References

External links

Houses on the National Register of Historic Places in California
Second Empire architecture in California
Houses completed in 1891
Houses in Tulare County, California
National Register of Historic Places in Tulare County, California
Museums in Tulare County, California
Historic house museums in California
Porterville, California
1891 establishments in California